is the 11th studio album by Japanese entertainer Miho Nakayama. Released through King Records on March 16, 1990, the album features the singles "Midnight Taxi" and "Semi-sweet Magic".

The album peaked at No. 3 on Oricon's albums chart. It also sold over 124,000 copies and was certified Gold by the RIAJ.

Track listing 
All music is arranged by Tomoji Sogawa, except where indicated.

Charts

Certification

References

External links
 
 
 

1990 albums
Miho Nakayama albums
Japanese-language albums
King Records (Japan) albums